John Fairfax (24 October 1804 – 16 June 1877) was an English-born journalist, company director, politician, librarian and newspaper owner, known for the incorporation of the major newspapers of modern-day Australia.

Early life
Fairfax was born in Barford, Warwickshire, the second son of William Fairfax and his wife, Elizabeth née Jesson. The Fairfax family for many years were lords of the manor of Barford, but estates had been lost and William Fairfax at the time of John's birth was in the building and furnishing trade. In 1817, John Fairfax was apprenticed to William Perry, a bookseller and printer in Warwick, and in 1825 went to London where he worked as a compositor in a general printing office and on the Morning Chronicle. Within two years, Fairfax had left and established himself at Leamington Spa as a printer, bookseller and stationer. There, on 31 July 1827, he married Sarah Reading, daughter of James and Sarah Reading. He became the printer of the Leamington Spa Courier, and in 1835 he purchased an interest in another paper The Leamington Chronicle and Warwickshire Reporter. He had a book binding business in Leamington. At this time Leamington was one of the leading spa towns in the UK.

In 1836, Fairfax published a letter criticizing the conduct of a local solicitor, who soon brought an action against him. Though judgement was given for the defendant, the solicitor appealed. Judgement was again given for Fairfax but the costs of the actions were so heavy that he had to apply to the Insolvency Court. There was sympathy for him and his friends offered assistance but he decided to make a fresh start in a new land, and in May 1838, sailed for the colony of New South Wales in the Lady Fitzherbert with his wife and three children, his mother and a brother-in-law. After a voyage of about 130 days, they reached Sydney on 26 September 1838; Fairfax had just £5 in his pocket.

Business activities in Australia
Fairfax worked as a compositor before being appointed librarian of the Australian subscription library on 1 April 1839. The salary was only £100 a year but he had free quarters for his family in pleasant surroundings. He found he was able to get some typesetting, and he also contributed articles to the various Sydney newspapers. What was possibly more important was his contacting through the library the best educated men of Sydney, and he became friendly with some of them. One of these was a member of the staff of the Sydney Herald, Charles Kemp, with whom he joined forces to purchase the Herald for the sum of £10,000.

The paper was bought on terms, friends helped the two men to find the deposit, and on 8 February 1841, they took control as proprietors. The two men formed a well-run partnership as each had qualities that supplemented the other's. Fairfax and Kemp worked in harmony for 12 years and firmly established the paper as the leading Australian newspaper of the day. It was given the fuller title of the Sydney Morning Herald in 1842, and in spite of a period of depression Fairfax suffered, both partners, by 1853, were in prosperous positions. Kemp then decided to retire. The partnership was dissolved in September 1853 and Charles, John's eldest son, became a partner. In the previous year, his father had visited England and seeking out his old creditors repaid every man in full with interest added. Under Fairfax and his sons, the paper continually increased in public favour and the great increase of population in the 1850s added much to its prosperity. It was always conservative; G. B. Barton in his Literature in New South Wales said in 1866 that its Toryism had "increased in a direct ratio to the Radicalism of the constitution, and its prosperity in a direct ratio to its Toryism". But this is an overstatement. The Herald was moved to its present site in 1856, and at that date claimed to have the largest circulation in the "colonial empire". A weekly journal, The Sydney Mail, was established, its first number was published on 7 July 1860, and it continued to appear until 1938.

In 1851, John Fairfax was a foundation director of the Australian Mutual Provident Society, and in the 1860s a director of the Sydney Insurance Co., the New South Wales Marine Insurance Co., the Australian Joint Stock Bank and The Australian Gaslight Co. and a trustee of the Savings Bank of New South Wales.

Religion
Fairfax was a sincerely religious man, a member of the Congregational Church at Pitt Street. However, his paper was kept free from religious bias and was in no way responsible for the strong sectarian feelings which then existed in Sydney. His household was typically Victorian in its outlook. However, in the newspaper, due importance was given to music and the theatre, literature and art. To Fairfax, the conduct of the press was a sacred trust and he never betrayed this.

Final years
On 26 December 1863, Charles Fairfax, the eldest son and Fairfax's right-hand man on the paper, was thrown from his horse and killed. John Fairfax never fully recovered from his son's death, but the work of the newspaper went on. In 1865, Fairfax and his wife again visited England where they studied the latest newspaper methods. Fairfax was appointed a member of the New South Wales Legislative Council in 1874, but never took an active part in politics.

His wife, Sarah, died on 12 August 1875 and soon afterwards his own health began to fail. He died at his home, Ginahgulla, Bellevue Hill, on 16 June 1877. He was buried at the Rookwood Cemetery, Independent Section, on 19 June 1877.

Legacy
Of his children, his second son, Sir James Reading Fairfax (1834–1919), entered his father's office in 1852 and was admitted as a partner in 1856. When his father died, James Fairfax was in control of the paper which continued to thrive. James Fairfax was intimately associated with it for 67 years. Like his father, Fairfax was a religious man, and for a long period was president of the YMCA as well as dedicated to helping other social services of the community. He died on 28 March 1919 and was buried in the Congregational section of Rookwood cemetery.

Two of James Fairfax's sons carried on the traditions of the paper, Geoffrey Evan Fairfax (1861–1930) and Sir James Oswald Fairfax (1863–1928). They entered the office on the same day in 1889 and each had a large share in the conduct of the paper. A third son, Charles Burton Fairfax, retired in 1904 and went to live in England. His son Captain J. Griffyth Fairfax, born in 1886, was a member of the House of Commons for some years, and has published several volumes of verse of which a list will be found in E. Morris Miller's Australian Literature. Warwick Oswald Fairfax, son of Sir James Oswald Fairfax, born in 1901, became managing director in 1930.

John Fairfax's name lives on in the form of Fairfax Media, formerly John Fairfax Holdings and before that, John Fairfax and Sons; although the Fairfax family no longer control the eponymous company.

References

1804 births
1877 deaths
Australian Congregationalists
John
Journalists from New South Wales
People from Warwick
Australian newspaper chain founders
19th-century British journalists
English male journalists
English emigrants to Australia
Members of the New South Wales Legislative Council
19th-century English male writers
19th-century Australian politicians
Australian librarians
Burials at Rookwood Cemetery
The Sydney Morning Herald people
19th-century Australian businesspeople
19th-century Australian journalists
19th-century Australian male writers
Australian male journalists